Paromny is a rural locality (a settlement) in Kozlovsky Selsoviet of Volodarsky District, Astrakhan Oblast, Russia. The population was 868 as of 2010. There are 4 streets.

Geography 
Paromny is located 3 km east of Volodarsky (the district's administrative centre) by road. Kozlovo is the nearest rural locality.

References 

Rural localities in Volodarsky District, Astrakhan Oblast